Trois-Rivières station is a former railway station in Trois-Rivières, Québec, Canada. It was designated as a federal heritage site in 1990.

History 
The station was built in 1924 to replace the original 1872 structure which served as the Trois-Rivierès stop along the route connecting Québec City and Montréal via the North Shore of the St. Lawrence River.

The station was acquired by Via Rail Canada in December 1985. In 1987 it became an intermodal station serving intercity bus traffic as well as trains. Passenger train service to Trois-Rivierès ceased as a result of the 1990 Via Rail cuts, and bus service to the station ceased in 1998. The station is still owned by VIA Rail, and leased by the City of Trois-Rivierès. The station building is used for purposes unrelated to transportation.

References

External links 

 
 

Transport in Trois-Rivières
Buildings and structures in Trois-Rivières
Railway stations in Mauricie
Designated Heritage Railway Stations in Quebec
Heritage sites in Mauricie
Disused railway stations in Canada
Railway stations in Canada opened in 1924
Railway stations closed in 1990
Railway stations in Quebec
1924 establishments in Quebec